Kracht Castle Island is a castle built by Don Kratch, a retired math teacher, on a man-made island outside Junction City, Kansas. Started in the 1990s he has worked by himself to build the castle as a hobby.

See also
List of Kansas landmarks

External links
Kansas Travel site
Tourism site
Map: 

Landmarks in Kansas
Buildings and structures in Geary County, Kansas
Roadside attractions in Kansas
1990s establishments in Kansas